David Adkins (born March 11, 1961) is an attorney and former member of the Kansas State Legislature. , he leads The Council of State Governments as its ninth executive director and CEO.

Adkins earned degrees in political science and law from the University of Kansas where he was elected student body president and was the first KU student selected to receive the prestigious Harry S. Truman Scholarship. In law school he was a regional champion in the National Moot Court Competition and received law school awards for appellate advocacy. University of Kansas School of Law. He worked his way through college as a toll collector on the Kansas Turnpike. 

He entered state government in 1993, after successfully running as a Republican for the Kansas House of Representatives in the 1992 elections, and won re-election to three additional two-year terms representing a district that included all of the City of Leawood, Kansas, a suburb of Kansas City, MO.  In the 2000 election, he was elected to the Kansas Senate. Kansas Senate's 7th district, which includes Northeast Johnson County, Kansas.

During his service in the Kansas House, Adkins chaired the House Committee on Taxation and the Appropriations Committee. He also served as vice-chair of the House Judiciary Committee. 

Adkins was elected the 1997 chair of The Council of State Governments Midwestern Legislative Conference. 

Adkins was appointed Chair of the Kansas Youth Authority by Kansas Governor Bill Graves. Adkins chaired the House Select Committee on Juvenile Crime. 

Adkins chaired the Joint Committee on Arts and Cultural Resources and was a member of the Kansas Film Commission. 

As a state senator, Adkins chaired the 
Reapportionment Committee and was Vice Chair of the Ways and Means Committee.  
 
The Harry S. Truman Scholarship Foundation presented both of its highest honors to Adkins in recognition of outstanding public service. 

The Kansas City Women’s Political Caucus presented Adkins with its Mel Carnahan Good Guy Award. 

Adkins was a partner in the Kansas City area law firm founded by Kansas Governor Robert F. Bennett. Adkins is admitted to practice law before the state and federal courts of Kansas, The United States Court of Appeals for the 10th Circuit and the Supreme Court of the United States. Adkins received the Outstanding Young Lawyer Award from the Kansas Bar Association.

Adkins was the founding executive director of the Community Foundation of Johnson County, Kansas, an affiliate of the Greater Kansas City Community Foundation, where Adkins also served as Special Counsel. 

After his time in the legislature, Adkins served as Vice Chancellor for External Affairs at the University of Kansas Medical Center where he helped guide the successful campaign to approve a sales tax to fund the Johnson County Research Triangle, which provided a dedicated source of revenue for research at the KU Cancer Center. 

Adkins received a Doctor of Humane Letters (Honorary) degree from the Kansas City University of Medicine and Biosciences. Baker University twice presented Adkins with university honors for distinguished public service and for leadership in higher education. 

Adkins was named  Leadership Kansas Alumnus of the Year. 

Adkins was a member of the University of Kansas Law School Board of Governors, was a Trustee of William Jewell College and is a member of the Board of Visitors of the Martin School of Public Policy and Administration at the University of Kentucky. 

In 2008, after a national search, he was named executive director and CEO of The Council of State Governments, a nonpartisan, nonprofit association of all the American states, commonwealths and territories. CSG is among the Big 7 organizations of state and local officials in the United States. CSG, founded in 1933,  has offices in Lexington, KY; Sacramento, CA; Atlanta, GA; New York, NY; Chicago, IL; and Washington, D.C. 

Adkins lectures on federalism and state government at the Washington, D.C. based Center for Strategic and International Studies. 

Adkins currently serves as an elected member of the Board of Trustees of the Kentucky Retirement System and is a member of the investment committee.

Adkins is a Fellow of the National Academy of Public Administration.

References

Republican Party Kansas state senators
20th-century American politicians
21st-century American politicians
People from Leawood, Kansas
University of Kansas School of Law alumni
Kansas lawyers
1961 births
Living people